Walter Lee is the name of:

Walter Lee (English politician) for Essex (1350–1395)
Walter Lee (Australian politician) (1874–1963), Nationalist Party Premier of Tasmania
Walter Lee (Louisiana politician) (1921–2015), served for fifty-six years as Clerk of Court of Evangeline Parish, Louisiana, from 1956 to 2012
Walter Lee (New Zealand politician) (1811–1887), 19th century New Zealand MP
Walter Lee (trade unionist) (1904–1967), British trade union leader
Dick Lee (Australian footballer) (1889–1968), Walter Henry "Dick" Lee, Australian rules footballer for the Collingwood Football Club
Walter C. Lee (Louisiana Educator) (born 1934)

See also
Walter Lea (1874–1936), Canadian politician
Walter Leigh (1905–1942), English composer